Wes DeMott is an American political thriller writer who was born in Roseburg, Oregon. He honorably served in the U.S. Navy, is a former FBI agent, private investigator, and has worked as an actor.

Bibliography

Loving Zelda, A Story of Change Reluctantly Told (2011),  Admiral House Publishing
The Typhoon Sanction (2011), . Admiral House Publishing
Tortuga Gold, A Mayday Salvage and Rescue Adventure (2011),  Admiral House Publishing
Walking K (1998), . 9780965960267. Admiral House
Vapors (1999),  Admiral House
Stiny, (2000) , . Czech translation of Vapors, published by Alpress.
Árnyak (2001), Hungarian translation of Vapors, Athenaeum (Hungary).
Фонд (2008), 978-5-226-00257-1. Russian translation of Vapors.
The Fund (2004), .  Leisure Books
Heat Sync, (2006), . 9780843955453. Leisure Books
The Fund, audio book (2009) . Books in Motion.
Heat Sync, audio book (2009) . Books in Motion
"Walking K", audio book (2009), . Books in Motion

References

External links
author website

20th-century American novelists
Novelists from Florida
Living people
Novelists from Oregon
Federal Bureau of Investigation agents
American thriller writers
21st-century American novelists
American male novelists
20th-century American male writers
21st-century American male writers
Year of birth missing (living people)
People from Roseburg, Oregon